The 12th TCA Awards were presented by the Television Critics Association in a ceremony hosted by Heidi Swedberg. The ceremony was held on July 20, 1996, at the Ritz-Carlton Huntington Hotel and Spa in Pasadena, California.

Winners and nominees

Multiple wins 
The following shows received multiple wins:

Multiple nominations 
The following shows received multiple nominations:

References

External links
Official website 
1996 TCA Awards at IMDb.com

1996 television awards
1996 in American television
TCA Awards ceremonies